George was a glossy monthly magazine centered on the theme of politics-as-lifestyle founded by John F. Kennedy Jr. and Michael J. Berman with publisher Hachette Filipacchi Media U.S. in New York City in September 1995. Its tagline was "Not Just Politics As Usual." It was published from 1995 to 2001.

Overview
For the debut issue, creative director Matt Berman (no relation to co-founder Michael Berman) conceived a cover which received a great deal of attention for its image of Cindy Crawford dressed as George Washington photographed by Herb Ritts.

George departed from the format of traditional political publications, whose audience primarily comprised people in or around the political world. The general template for George was similar to magazines such as Rolling Stone, Esquire or Vanity Fair. The consistent underlying theme was to marry the themes of celebrity and media with the subject of politics in such a way that the general public would find political news and discourse about politics more interesting to read.

Notable contributors

 Paul Begala
 George Clooney
 Kellyanne Conway
 Ann Coulter
 Al D'Amato
 Roger Black
 Al Franken
 Stephen Glass
 Rush Limbaugh
 Norman Mailer
 Chris Matthews
 Steve Miller
 Cathy Scott
 W. Thomas Smith Jr.
 Jackie Stallone
 Naomi Wolf

Reception
 
When it first appeared, George attracted great interest, and for a brief period had the largest circulation of any political magazine in the nation, partly due to the celebrity status of Kennedy, but it soon began losing money. Kennedy and George occasionally courted controversy to boost sales, one notable example being the 1997 issue wherein Kennedy in his editorial lambasted his cousins Michael Kennedy and Joe Kennedy II, whose marital scandals had recently made news, as "poster boys for bad behavior."

Kennedy later complained that the magazine was not taken seriously in the publishing world.

Critics called George "the political magazine for people who don't understand politics," assailing it for "stripping any and all discussion of political issues from its coverage of politics." In a feature in its final issue, Spy magazine asserted that the magazine's premise was flawed because, "Politics overlapped with Pop Culture in such a limited number of ways". That fairly critical profile in Spy described George as "scrambling for celebrities 'with tits' as often as possible to put on the cover and then trying to figure out what that person had to do with politics".

Decline
After Kennedy died in a plane crash in 1999, Hachette Filipacchi Magazines purchased Kennedy's portion of the magazine from his estate and continued for over a year, with Frank Lalli as editor-in-chief. With falling advertising sales, the magazine ceased publication in 2001, two years after Kennedy's death.
 
In 2005, Harvard Kennedy School held a panel discussion titled "Not Just Politics as Usual," which commemorated the 10th anniversary of the magazine's launch. The panel was moderated by Tom Brokaw and featured appearances by other journalists.

Increased popularity 
A February 1997 edition of George with the tagline "Survival Guide to the Future", wherein Kennedy interviews Bill Gates, has become well sought-after by adherents of the QAnon conspiracy theory, with one copy online being listed at $3,499.99.

References

External links

Kennedy School Press Release: George Magazine Anniversary Forum 

1995 establishments in New York City
2001 disestablishments in New York (state)
Monthly magazines published in the United States
Defunct political magazines published in the United States
Defunct magazines published in the United States
Magazines established in 1995
Magazines disestablished in 2001
Magazines published in New York City